Ian D. Gauld (1947-2009) was a British entomologist who specialised in the study of parasitic ichneumon wasps. According to his obituary, he is the most prolific ichneumon taxonomist in history, describing over 2000 species of ichneumonids.

References

1947 births
2009 deaths